The 1978 Old Dominion 500 was a NASCAR Winston Cup Series race that took place on September 24, 1978, at Martinsville Speedway in Martinsville, Virginia. This race was the 28th to be held as a part of what is now known as the First Data 500.

By 1980, NASCAR had completely stopped tracking the year model of all the vehicles and most teams did not take stock cars to the track under their own power anymore.

Background
Martinsville Speedway is one of five short tracks to hold NASCAR races. The track's turns are banked at eleven degrees, while the front stretch, the location of the finish line, is banked at zero degrees. The back stretch also has a zero degree banking.

Race report
The complete time of the race was three hours, nineteen minutes, and fifty-four seconds. There were four cautions given out by the NASCAR officials for nineteen laps. Cale Yarborough defeated Darrell Waltrip by three car lengths; taking home his sixth and final Cup victory at Martinsville. Yarborough was on a tear here in the second half of the 1970s, this win marked his fourth win over the course of the prior five Martinsville races. Twenty thousand people attended this live race.

Chevrolet vehicles would dominate the starting grid of the event with multi-car teams dominating the lineup. By the late 1970s, it had become prohibitively expensive for a single person to own a NASCAR team. A series of oil crises in addition to changing sponsorship needs started to bring in the age of the multi-car team and the slow decline of the independent owners.

Harry Gant would lead a NASCAR Cup Series race for the first time in his career. However, he would only run ninety laps before having to leave the race due to an engine problem. Terry Labonte's third career start nets him his third career top-10 finish. Though running up front for half the laps one completes is generally a good thing, Gant's 45 laps led translate in this case to 90 laps run before the engine expired. This would cause him to be relegated to a 28th-place finish and only $1,070 in prize winnings ($ when considering inflation).

Total winnings for this race were $101,430 ($ when considering inflation) and Cale Yarborough took the majority of the winnings with an easy $24,950 paycheck ($ when considering inflation).

Satch Worley would retire from NASCAR after this race while Lennie Pond would never earn another pole position start after this race. Herb Nab was Pond's chief mechanic for the sole qualifying run that managed to get him the pole position for the event along with an extremely rare silver trophy.

Other crew chiefs who fully participated in the race were Darrell Bryant, Junie Donlavey, Buddy Parrott, Jake Elder, Kirk Shelmerdine, Dale Inman, Walter Ballard, Tim Brewer, and Bud Moore.

Qualifying

Finishing order
Section reference:

 Cale Yarborough
 Darrell Waltrip
 Benny Parsons†
 Neil Bonnett†
 Lennie Pond
 Richard Petty
 Bobby Allison
 Dave Marcis
 Terry Labonte
 Buddy Arrington
 James Hylton†
 Richard Childress
 Dick Brooks†
 Satch Worley*
 Gary Myers
 Ronnie Thomas
 Dick May†
 Ed Negre
 Baxter Price
 Ferrel Harris†
 Frank Warren†
 J.D. McDuffie*†
 Jimmy Means*
 Roger Hamby*
 David Pearson*
 Buddy Baker*†
 Tommy Gale*†
 Harry Gant*
 Tighe Scott*
 Cecil Gordon*†

* Driver failed to finish race
† Driver is deceased

Timeline
Section reference:
 Start of race: Lennie Pond had the pole position to begin the race.
 Lap 20: Cecil Gordon had to be brought out of the race because his brakes weren't working.
 Lap 42: Tighe Scott had a terminal crash; forcing him to exit the race.
 Lap 46: Harry Gant took over the lead from Lennie Pond.
 Lap 90: Cale Yarborough took over the lead from Harry Gant.
 Lap 111: Tommy Gale's engine could not go on any longer and gave out in the middle of the race.
 Lap 247: Darrell Waltrip took over the lead from Cale Yarborough.
 Lap 270: Cale Yarborough took over the lead from Darrell Waltrip.
 Lap 329: Buddy Baker's engine stopped working properly.
 Lap 340: The rear end of David Pearson's vehicle fell out, making it too dangerous for him to continue racing.
 Lap 354: Roger Hamby had serious issues with his brakes that required him to exit the event.
 Lap 403: Jimmy Means managed to overheat his vehicle while racing.
 Lap 409: J.D. McDuffie's terribly performing brakes forced him into the sidelines.
 Lap 453: Ferrell Harris had a faulty engine that forced him out of the race.
 Lap 473: Darrell Waltrip took over the lead from Cale Yarborough.
 Lap 488: Cale Yarborough took over the lead from Darrell Waltrip.
 Finish: Cale Yarborough was officially declared the winner of the event.

Standings after the race

References

Old Dominion 500
Old Dominion 500
NASCAR races at Martinsville Speedway